The Stepfather is a 2009 American psychological thriller film and a remake of the 1987 film of the same name. The film was directed by Nelson McCormick and stars Dylan Walsh, Sela Ward, Penn Badgley, Amber Heard and Jon Tenney. It is loosely based on the crimes of mass murderer John List. It was released on October 16, 2009, receiving negative reviews from critics and grossing $31 million against its $20 million budget.

Plot
In a suburban Utah house, Grady Edwards transforms himself in a bathroom. He shaves off his beard, dyes his hair, and removes his brown contact lenses. As he leaves the house, the camera reveals the bodies of his wife and her three children. As the police investigate, it is said that another family was murdered in a similar manner in New Jersey not long ago, which causes them to believe there is a serial killer on the loose.

Susan Harding, a recently divorced Oregon housewife, is shopping in a grocery store with her youngest children where she meets Grady, who introduces himself as David Harris, and claims that his wife and daughter were killed in a car accident. Susan, desperate for love, is charmed by David, and she rushes into an engagement to be married in less than six months.

Susan's eldest son, Michael returns home from military school and is immediately suspicious of his mother's fiancé. David invites him down to the basement, where he has installed locked cabinets, and tries to befriend him over tequila shots. Michael's suspicions start when David uses the wrong name when mentioning his deceased daughter. After Susan says that Mrs. Cutters warned her that America's Most Wanted ran a profile on a serial killer who looks like David, David sneaks into Mrs. Cutters' house and throws her down her basement stairs, then suffocates her.

Susan's ex-husband Jay confronts David angrily about laying hands on his younger son, Sean. He warns Susan that she knows nothing about David. Doubts about David mount further when he quits his job working as a real estate agent for Susan's sister, Jackie, to avoid displaying a photo ID and other forms of identification. Later, Jay confronts David about an apparent lie regarding his college history. David clubs him with a vase and suffocates him with a plastic bag. He sends Michael a text with Jay's phone saying that David checked out okay.

When the neighbor's body is discovered two weeks later, David tells the family. Michael is alarmed because he overheard David being told by the mailman, who gave less detail than David. While Michael's girlfriend, Kelly, tries to get him to focus on college applications, he grows more obsessed with the contradictions in David's stories. The situation comes to a head when David intercepts an email from Jackie about hiring an investigator. He then goes to Jackie's house and drowns her in her pool. Determined to discover what was in the locked cabinets, Michael breaks into the basement as Kelly keeps a lookout. In the basement, Michael eventually discovers his dad's body in a freezer. David knocks out Kelly and traps Michael in the basement. The commotion awakens Susan, and he berates her parenting skills and says that he thought she could be "Mrs. Grady Edwards". On Susan's stunned reaction, David grimaces and asks, "Who am I here?" Susan tries to snap him out of it by saying his name, causing him to say, "David! I'm David Harris!"

Susan, realizing the situation after noticing the unconscious Kelly, flees to the bathroom, locking herself in. David kicks the door in, shattering the mirror behind it. Susan picks up a shard of the mirror, holding it behind her. David grabs her, they struggle, and she manages to stab him in the neck with the shard. He falls to the floor, apparently dead. Michael escapes from the basement and finds Kelly. They find Susan in the hallway across from the bathroom, thinking David is dead. Then David approaches from behind and blocks the stairs, chasing all of them into the attic, where he and Michael fight. Both fall onto the roof and then off the edge of the roof to the ground, where they lie unconscious.

When Michael wakes up, he finds out he had been in a coma for just over a month. He learns that David is still alive and fled the scene before the police arrived. The end scene shows David, who has again changed his appearance and his name to Chris Ames. He is working at a hardware store when he meets a woman who is shopping with her two sons.

Cast

Production 
Terry O'Quinn, who portrayed the stepfather in the 1987 original and its 1989 sequel, was approached by director Nelson McCormick to appear in the remake in a cameo role, but according to producer Mark Morgan, O'Quinn turned down the offer. Filming was completed on April 15, 2008.

Release

Theatrical
The film was distributed by Screen Gems. It was released in cinemas on October 16, 2009.

Home media
Sony Pictures Home Entertainment released the film to DVD and Blu-ray on a special Unrated Directors Cut containing a few more special features and depicting each death in the film in a more graphic tone.

Reception

Box office
It grossed $29.1 million in North America and $2.1 million in other territories, for a worldwide gross of $31.2 million, against its budget of $20 million. The film opened #5 at the box office, grossing $11.6 million in 2,734 theaters, with an average of $4,236 per theater.

Critical response
 

Kirk Honeycutt of The Hollywood Reporter wrote: "This remake turns a fondly remembered horror/thriller into a mild and tedious suspense film." Kevin Thomas of the Los Angeles Times wrote of the film being "a handsome, thoughtfully crafted production that generates a mounting terror securely anchored by assured performances, consistent psychological persuasiveness and believable dialogue."

References

External links 

 

2009 films
2009 horror films
2009 psychological thriller films
Remakes of American films
American horror thriller films
American serial killer films
Horror film remakes
Horror films based on actual events
Films scored by Charlie Clouser
Films directed by Nelson McCormick
Screen Gems films
Uxoricide in fiction
Fiction about familicide
2000s English-language films
2000s American films